Auroux is a commune in the Lozère department in southern France.

Geography
The Chapeauroux forms part of the commune's southern border, flows north through the middle of the commune, then forms part of its northern border.

Population

See also
Communes of the Lozère department

References

External links

Official website (French)

Communes of Lozère